A rapture dream is one which appears to the sleeper to be "more real than real". Sometimes such dreams are associated with religious or prophetic insights.

As the poet George Crabbe explained:
Ah happy he, who thus in magic themes
O'er worlds bewitch'd in early rapture dreams;
Where wild enchantment waves her potent wand
And fancy's beauties fill her fairy land. 
Where doubtful objects strange desires excite,
And Fear and Ignorance afford delight.

History of rapture dreams
 Plutarch's Lives, a history of the Ancients, relates that Julius Caesar on the night before crossing the Rubicon, "had an impious dream, that he was unnaturally familiar with his own mother."
 On the night before Caesar's death on the Ides of March his wife dreamt "that time she was weeping over Caesar, and holding him butchered in her arms."

Dream